Darvar or Darwar may refer to:
 Darvar, Kohgiluyeh and Boyer-Ahmad
 Darvar, Mazandaran
 Darvar, Semnan